The Deputy Clerk of the House of Commons acts as assistant to the Clerk in the administration of the House of Commons of Canada. The post was created in 1987. In 2017, the post was split into two: a Deputy Clerk for Procedure and a Deputy Clerk for Administration.

List of Deputy Clerks
 1987–1997: Mary Anne Griffith
 1998–1999: Camille Montpetit
 1999: William C. Corbett
 2000–2005: Audrey O'Brien
 2005–2014: Marc Bosc
 2014–2017: André Gagnon (acting)
 2017–2021: André Gagnon (procedure)
 2017–present: Michel Patrice (administration)
 2021–present: Eric Janse (procedure)

References 
 
 Officers and Officials of Parliament of Canada

Deputy Clerks
Canadian civil servants
House of Commons of Canada
Ceremonial officers in Canada
Clerks of the House of Commons (Canada)